The White Horse Inn (or White Horse Inn) (German title: Im weißen Rößl) is an operetta or musical comedy by Ralph Benatzky and Robert Stolz in collaboration with a number of other composers and writers, set in the picturesque Salzkammergut region of Upper Austria. It is about the head waiter of the White Horse Inn in St. Wolfgang who is desperately in love with the owner of the inn, a resolute young woman who at first only has eyes for one of her regular guests. Sometimes classified as an operetta, the show enjoyed huge successes in the West End (651 performances at the Coliseum starting 8 April 1931), as a Broadway version, and was filmed several times. In a way similar to The Sound of Music and the three Sissi movies, the play and its film versions have contributed to the popular image of Austria as an alpine idyll—the kind of idyll tourists have been seeking for almost a century now. Today, Im weißen Rößl is mainly remembered for its songs, many of which have become popular classics.

The original play
In the last decade of the 19th century, Oscar Blumenthal, a theatre director from Berlin, Germany, was on holiday in Lauffen (now part of Bad Ischl), a small town in the vicinity of St. Wolfgang. There, at the inn where he was staying, Blumenthal happened to witness the head waiter's painful wooing of his boss, a widow. Amused, Blumenthal used the story as the basis of a comedy—without music—which he co-authored with actor Gustav Kadelburg. However, Blumenthal and Kadelburg relocated the action from Lauffen to the much more prominent St. Wolfgang, where the Gasthof Weißes Rößl had actually existed since 1878. Having thus chanced upon a suitable title, the authors went to work, and Im weißen Rößl eventually premiered in Berlin in 1897.

The play was an immediate success. The Berlin audience would laugh at the comic portrayal of well-to-do city dwellers such as Wilhelm Giesecke, a manufacturer of underwear, and his daughter Ottilie, who have travelled all the way from Berlin to St. Wolfgang and now, on holiday, cannot help displaying many of the characteristics of the nouveaux-riches. "Wär' ick bloß nach Ahlbeck jefahren"—"If only I had gone to Ahlbeck", Giesecke sighs as he considers his unfamiliar surroundings and the strange dialect spoken by the wild mountain people that inhabit the Salzkammergut. At the same time the play promoted tourism in Austria, especially in and around St. Wolfgang, with a contemporary edition of the Baedeker praising the natural beauty of the region and describing the White Horse Inn as nicely situated at the lakefront next to where the steamboat can be taken for a romantic trip across the Wolfgangsee. The White Horse Inn was even awarded a Baedeker star.

Sydney Rosenfeld, a prolific American adapter of foreign plays, premièred an English version of the play titled At the White Horse Tavern at Wallack's Theatre in 1899, with a cast including Amelia Bingham and Leo Ditrichstein.

The musical comedy

Just as the play was about to be forgotten—a silent film The White Horse Inn directed by Richard Oswald and starring Liane Haid had been made in Germany in 1926—it was revived, again in Berlin, and this time as a musical comedy. During a visit to the Salzkammergut, the actor Emil Jannings told Berlin theatre manager Erik Charell about the comedy. Charell was interested and commissioned a group of prominent authors and composers to come up with a musical show based on Blumenthal and Kadelburg's play. They were Ralph Benatzky, Robert Stolz and Bruno Granichstaedten (music), Robert Gilbert (lyrics), Hans Müller-Einigen and Charell himself.

The show premiered in Berlin on 8 November 1930. Immediately afterwards it became a success around the world, with long runs in cities like London, Paris, Vienna, Munich and New York. During the Third Reich the comedy was marginalized and not performed (Goebbels called it "eine Revue, die uns heute zum Hals heraushängt"—"the kind of entertainment we find boring and superfluous today"), whereas people in the 1950s, keen on harmony and shallow pleasures, eagerly greeted revivals of the show. German-language films based on the musical comedy were made in 1935, 1952 and 1960.

Roles

Synopsis

It is summertime at the Wolfgangsee. Josepha Vogelhuber, the young, attractive but resolute owner of the White Horse Inn, has been courted for some time by her head waiter, Leopold Brandmeyer. While appreciating his aptness for the job, she mistrusts all men as potential gold-diggers, rejects Leopold's advances and longingly waits for the arrival of Dr Siedler, a lawyer who has been one of her regular guests for many years. This year, Josepha hopes, Siedler might eventually propose to her.

When Siedler arrives, he finds himself in the very same place as Wilhelm Giesecke, his client Sülzheimer's business rival, and immediately falls in love with Giesecke's beautiful daughter Ottilie. As it happens, Sülzheimer's son Sigismund, a would-be beau, also arrives at the White Horse Inn. Angry at first about Siedler's presence at the same inn, Giesecke soon has the idea of marrying off his daughter to Sigismund Sülzheimer, thus turning a pending lawsuit into an advantageous business merger. However, Siedler's love is reciprocated by Ottilie, who adamantly refuses to marry Sigismund, while Sigismund himself has fallen for Klärchen Hinzelmann, a naive beauty who accompanies her professorial father on a tour through the Salzkammergut.

Seeing all this, Leopold Brandmeyer decides that he has had enough and quits his job. Josepha has also done a lot of thinking in the meantime, reconsiders her head waiter's proposal of marriage, and can persuade him to stay—not just as an employee but also as proprietor. Love gets its way with the other two couples as well, and the play ends with the prospect of a triple marriage.

Musical numbers
 "Im weißen Rössl am Wolfgangsee" (Music: Ralph Benatzky)
 "Was kann der Sigismund dafür, dass er so schön ist" (Robert Gilbert)
 "Im Salzkammergut, da kann man gut lustig sein" (Ralph Benatzky)
 "Es muss was Wunderbares sein" (Ralph Benatzky)
 "Mein Liebeslied muss ein Walzer sein" (Robert Stolz)
 "Zuschaun kann i net" (Bruno Granichstaedten)
 "Die ganze Welt ist himmelblau" (Robert Stolz)

Film adaptations

A post-war Argentinian movie in Spanish, La Hostería del caballito blanco, was directed by Benito Perojo and released in 1948. A Danish film of 1964 by Erik Balling, Sommer i Tyrol (although Tyrol is  the original setting), starred Dirch Passer and Susse Wold.

In addition, the musical triggered a number of spin-offs such as the 1961 Austrian comedy film  (The Black Horse Inn), directed by Franz Antel, about a young woman (surprisingly, it was Karin Dor again, who had just played Giesecke's daughter in the 1960 version) who inherits a dilapidated hotel on the shores of the Wolfgangsee. As a matter of fact, a number of hotels in St. Wolfgang do use similar names (Black Horse, White Stag, etc.).

Most recently, a new musical film adaptation of "Im Weissen Rössl" came out in November 2013 with the German title  from director Christian Theede. Unlike its predecessors, however, the movie was not filmed on location at the Hotel Im Weissen Rössl in St. Wolfgang, Austria.

Notes

References

External links
 History of The White Horse Inn in St. Wolfgang

German-language operettas
Compositions set in Austria
Broadway musicals
West End musicals
1930 musicals
Operas by Ralph Benatzky
Compositions by Robert Stolz